Rosenstein is surname of German and Yiddish origin. It may refer to:

People
 Allen B. Rosenstein (1920–2018), American systems engineers and UCLA Professor
 Avraham Rosenstein, original name of Avraham Even-Shoshan
 Barry Rosenstein, American hedge fund manager
 Carl von Rosenstein (1766–1836), Archbishop of Uppsala
 Elhanan Rosenstein (1796–1869), rabbi who served in Berlin from 1846 until 1869
 Erna Rosenstein (1913–2004), Austrian surrealist painter and poet
 Glenn Rosenstein, American record producer, engineer, sound mixer, and guitarist
 Hank Rosenstein (1920–2010), former professional American basketball player
 Justin Rosenstein (born 1983), American software programmer and entrepreneur
 Leo Rosenstein, original name of Leo Stein
 Måns von Rosenstein (1755–1801), Swedish Navy rear admiral
 Moshe Rosenstein (1880–1941), Lithuanian rabbi
 Nettie Rosenstein (1890–1980), Jewish-American fashion designer
 Nils Rosén von Rosenstein (1706–1773), Swedish physician
 Nils von Rosenstein (1752–1824), Swedish civil servant and propagator for enlightenment thinking
 Paul Rosenstein-Rodan (1902–1985), Austrian economist
 Rod Rosenstein (born 1965), Deputy Attorney General of the United States Department of Justice
 Samuel Murray Rosenstein (1909–1995), judge of the United States Customs Court
 Samuel Siegmund Rosenstein (1832–1906), German physician
 Willi Rosenstein (1892–1949), German flying ace in World War I
 Zeev Rosenstein (born 1954), infamous Israeli drug trafficker

Places
 21467 Rosenstein, main-belt asteroid
 Castle Rosenstein, in the Bad Cannstatt district of Stuttgart, Germany
 Museum am Rosenstein, part of the State Museum of Natural History in Stuttgart
 Rosenstein Park, English garden in Stuttgart, Germany
 Rosenstein (Swabian Jura), mountain in Germany
 Rosenstein Tunnel, the name of several past, present and planned tunnels in the Stuttgart area

Jewish surnames
Yiddish-language surnames